Coney Island is an abandoned island located in Massachusetts Bay in Salem, Massachusetts. It has light growth, with a small salt marsh.

References

Islands of Essex County, Massachusetts
Salem, Massachusetts
Uninhabited islands of Massachusetts
Islands of Massachusetts
Coastal islands of Massachusetts